MacKenzie Junction is the intersection of British Columbia Highway 39 and British Columbia Highway 97. It is 29km east of the town of Mackenzie, British Columbia on Highway 39, 17km north of McLeod Lake, British Columbia on Highway 97. It consists primarily of the MacKenzie Junction Cafe, a Petro Canada gas station with associated restaurant and convenience store. It serves as a stop for BC Bus North. It is an important stopping point for people en route to or from such remote communities as Fort Ware and Tsay Keh Dene.

References

External links
Cafe Facebook Page

Roads in British Columbia